Coccidiphila nivea is a moth in the family Cosmopterigidae. It is found in the United Arab Emirates.

References

Moths described in 2010
Cosmopteriginae
Endemic fauna of the United Arab Emirates